The Executioner's Song is a 1982 American made-for-television biographical crime drama film. It is a film adaptation of Norman Mailer's 1979 Pulitzer Prize-winning novel of the same name. The film is directed by Lawrence Schiller from a screenplay by Mailer.

Plot
The movie is about the final nine months of the life of Gary Gilmore, beginning with his release from prison at the age of 35 after serving 12 years for robbery in Indiana. He is allowed to fly to Utah to live with Brenda Nicol, a distant cousin who was close to him and agrees to sponsor him. She tries to help him get back to normal life, which he finds extremely difficult after being in prison for so long. He soon moves to live with his Uncle Vern, with whom he works in shoe repair, and Vern's wife. Gilmore next moves on to another job, at an insulation factory, where he performs well at first, but starts to have erratic hours and contentious relationships with co-workers.

Gilmore meets and becomes romantically involved with Nicole Baker, a 19-year-old young woman with two young children. Despite his efforts to reform himself, Gilmore begins to fight, steal items from stores, and abuse alcohol and drugs. The people who care for him are distressed to see these patterns re-emerge.

Nicole breaks up with Gilmore after he hits her, and she goes into hiding with her children. Gilmore soon murders two men in two separate robberies over two days. His cousin Brenda tells police she suspects Gilmore is involved, and he is taken into custody. He is convicted of one of the murders and sentenced to death under a state law designed to accommodate the US Supreme Court ruling on the death penalty, which found most state laws on capital punishment to constitute "cruel and unusual punishment," prohibited under the Constitution. States worked to revise their laws.

While his attorneys, the ACLU and his family try to persuade Gilmore to pursue more appeals, he argues to have the sentence carried out and becomes a national media sensation. Publishers and reporters vie to buy his story and film rights. The night before his death, family, friends and lawyers join Gilmore for a party on death row.

On January 17, 1977, Gilmore is executed by firing squad, as he chose. His body is then burned after parts are extracted for donation in accordance with his wishes. He was the first person to be judicially executed in the United States after the execution of Luis Monge in Colorado on June 2, 1967.

Cast 
 Tommy Lee Jones as Gary Mark Gilmore
 Christine Lahti as Brenda Nicol
 Rosanna Arquette as Nicole Baker
 Eli Wallach as Uncle Vern Damico
 Steven Keats as Larry Samuels
 Jordan Clarke as Johnny Nicol
 Richard Venture as Earl Dorius
 Jenny Wright as April Baker
 Walter Olkewicz as Pete Galovan
 Michael LeClair as Rikki Wood
 Pat Corley as Val Conlan
 Mary Ethel Gregory as Ida Damico
 John Dennis Johnston as Jimmy Poker-Game
 Norris Mailer as Lu-Ann (as Norris Church)
 Kenneth O'Brien as Spencer McGrath
 Rance Howard as Lt. Johnson
 Charles Cyphers as Noall Wootton
 Robert DeMotte as Garage Mechanic
 Jim Youngs as Sterling Baker
 Grace Zabriskie as Kathryne Baker

Production
Mailer originally asked Lanford Wilson to adapt the story, but Wilson politely declined. It was originally produced as a two-part TV movie running a total of 200 minutes on November 28 and 29, 1982. Later it was re-edited in a 97-minute theatrical version for European distribution, with additions of scenes of violence and nudity. Parts of the film were shot at the Utah State Prison in Draper and the city of Provo, Utah.

Reception
In what the New York Times described as a "searing performance," Tommy Lee Jones won an Emmy Award for his role in this work. Time Out- London said about the film's performances: "Jones (playing Gilmore) goes his own fascinating route to the loser's nirvana without recourse to psycho-style tics, while strong character performances from Arquette and Lahti constantly shift the focus back towards the everyday straitjacket of Utah underdogs."

References

External links

1982 television films
1982 films
1982 crime drama films
1980s biographical drama films
American crime drama films
American biographical drama films
Films based on non-fiction books
Films about capital punishment
Crime films based on actual events
NBC network original films
Films directed by Lawrence Schiller
Films set in 1976
Films set in 1977
Films set in Utah
Films shot in Utah
1980s American films